Shaltykbashevo (Şaltıqbaş) is a rural locality (a village) in Akbarisovsky Selsoviet, Sharansky District, Bashkortostan, Russia. The population was 8 as of 2010. There is 1 street.

Geography 
Shaltykbashevo is located 23 km northeast of Sharan (the district's administrative centre) by road. Yangaulovo is the nearest rural locality.

References 

Rural localities in Sharansky District